Tres Coronas (alternatively known by the nickname Triple Crown) were a group of three MCs, formed in early 2001 in Queens, New York, composed of the New Yorkers/Colombian Luis Alfonso Fonseca known as PoNchO or P.N.O a.k.a. Guajiro, the French/Colombian Sébastian Rocca known as Rocca a.k.a. El Chief, and the Dominican José Alberto Collado known as Reychesta a.k.a. Secret Weapon. Their music deals with issues of everyday life. Their best-known songs are off their albums Red Mixtape and Nuestra Cosa. Some of their hit tracks are "Falsedades", "Envidias", "Ahora O Nunca". Different producers such as Artwell Smart, Gallegos, Chaze, Shakim and others worked on their albums and projects.

History 

In 1999, Rocca was working in New York mixing his music and there he met PoNchO (P.N.O), who showed him his demo and they started working together on a future project, recording their first songs together, "La Corona" and "La Vuelta". In 2000, Rocca met a Colombian named Inti Limani in France, who later emigrated to New York, and was the one who they planned to include in the beginning. The New Yorker Natural and the Colombian Macko would also be part of the group, the latter was a former partner of P.N.O in the group C.T.O (Colombians Taking Over). In 2001, Rocca and P.N.O created an independent production called "Parcero Production". Shortly after Reychesta through New York producer Spank meets P.N.O, they both recorded a song that was never published called "Real Soldados" produced by Spank. Then P.N.O suggested to Rocca that they will work with him Dominican. One day they gather at the P.N.O house in Brooklyn and start improvising songs, while watching a horse race on television, in which the race rapporteur says: "triple crown" (crown translated into Spanish is corona), that is when Reychesta suggests baptizing the group as Tres Coronas, P.N.O and Rocca agreed with the idea. The designer of the official Tres Coronas logo was Hashim. The first song they made with the official name of the group was "Para El Futuro", composed and performed by Reychesta and P.N.O, produced by Shakim, this song was going to be part of the album "Playero 41: Past, Present & Future (Part 2)", from 1999 (initially performed only by Reychesta), but due to the delay in recording the song, it was finally part of the group's first mixtape. And the first song that the three members of the group recorded together was "El Trato". At the end of 2001, they had their first two concerts in Colombia, the first one that was presented was "Rap al Parque" (where they know the group La Etnnia) and the second one was in the "Coliseo el Campín". initially the group would make an album called "'Alma y Dolor", but that project was canceled. They distributed several CD's, the first in 2001, called "Mixtape", the second in 2002, called "Mixtape Remix" the third in 2004, called "New York Mixtape" and the fourth in 2005, called "Nuestra Cosa", the group's first studio album, includes 15 songs with collaborations of G.O.D Father Pt. III (of the group Infamous Mobb) and Cormega, but there was also a special edition published on June 27, 2006, through the label "Machete Music", the disc contains 17 tracks, plus a DVD with 5 videos and a documentary on the group, the production is in charge of "Parcero Production", includes two new musical themes.

 Nuestra Cosa: Deluxe Edition and group breakup (2005–2006) 

In the process of promoting "Nuestra Cosa: Deluxe Edition", Boy Wonder offered a contract to Tres Coronas on the seal "Chosen Few Emerald Entertainment, Inc.", but the only one to accept it was Reychesta, without telling his teammates. Reychesta main reason for accepting that contract was that Rocca and P.N.O paid him a "misery" that was not enough for him to finish his university studies as he wanted and had promised to finish them to his grandmother Ramona Collado, before she died. Also because they did not consider him as a member of the group, but as a simple employee of "Parcero Production". Shortly after Gustavo López, he also offered a contract to Tres Coronas on the label "Machete Music", which was accepted by the three members of the group, but Reychesta omitting that he had already signed with "Chosen Few Emerald Entertainment, Inc." legally damaged Tres Coronas in the negotiation of his contract with "Machete Music". Rocca and P.N.O learned through the lawyers of "Machete Music" and immediately fired the Dominican group, unleashing a battle of truly scandalous statements and threats. Rocca and P.N.O had to prove to the label that they were both Tres Coronas, of course they did not give Reychesta the money that corresponded to him, for the payment of $100,000 that "Machete Music" gave the group for the special edition of the album "Nuestra Cosa". They remastered the two new songs belonging to this new (CD/DVD), the first entitled "Otro Día" where Reychesta was the last to sing, this song has the collaboration of Negro Jetro, they also took it out of the song "Vamos a Jugar", here Reychesta was the one who started the song, which they sang with Kafu Banton, besides these two songs would be the only ones played on the radio, so the song "La Hacemos" was not published on the album, which was interpreted by the three members. In the beginning, this song only contained the voices of Rocca and P.N.O, who traveled without Reychesta to Puerto Rico, where they asked TNB to participate as producer of the theme, whose genre is Reggaeton (musical genre of which Rocca and P.N.O denied, however the first one says in the song: "people ask for reggaeton with my style, mommy likes it", and the second one says: "on the island of perreo, hamlets and ghettos this is true TNB and Tres Coronas"). Rocca did not like his own chorus of the song, which is why he subsequently asked Reychesta to participate in the song, and make a new choir (neither version of the song was officially published in a Tres Coronas album).

There are two documentaries of the group, the official and the unofficial, both called: "Tres Coronas: Nuestra Cosa", in the unofficial documentary, whose duration is 33:40, in the minute 2:15, appears P.N.O saying, "he was the one called Tres Coronas, as we are in Corona", pointing to Reychesta. In the 10:50 minute, P.N.O appears with TNB, in the process of creating a new Reggaeton song for the album, which later resulted in the song "La Hacemos", then in the 27:17-minute, Reychesta appears promoting the new album and saying "bring DVD and three new songs", referring to "Otro Día", "Vamos a Jugar" and "La Hacemos".

 Conflicts after the separation of Reychesta from the group 

After his departure from the group, Reychesta continues his singing career as a soloist in "Chosen Few Emerald Entertainment, Inc.", a company of Boy Wonder in which he had already signed approximately seven months before his departure from group Tres Coronas. The controversies continued because after their separation, Rocca and P.N.O retain the name Tres Coronas, after Rocca register the trademark; Tres Coronas in his name, under the "Parcero Production" seal, without consent from Reychesta, the latter says that the name of the group should not have been maintained, since there are not three, but two. Rocca and P.N.O also recorded all the songs of the group for the two of them, including those written by Reychesta without giving him the possibility of having the copyright of the group or his own songs. Rocca and P.N.O in their new 2007 mixtape, "Street Album", did not include the songs; "Cuáles", "Las Pistolas" and "MC Killa", also remastered several songs in which Reychesta participated one of them was "Lecciones", which he renamed as "Las 5 Reglas" replacing him with Macko, also removed him from the song "New York", replaced Reychesta by Sergio Veneno and also the music producer Artwell Smart by P. Castro (producer Gallegos already I had previously used this track, in 1999 in the song "Les Incorruptibles" of the group La Cliqua). In 2011 Rocca and P.N.O on their album "La Música Es Mi Arma" published a song called "Aquí Llegamos (Intro)" in which they used the production of Artwell Smart (music producer and best friend of Reychesta). Reychesta published an essay of the group performed at Rocca house, corresponding to 2004, where Reychesta teaches Rocca to be more versatile musically, using this same track from music producer Artwell Smart. Reychesta for his part remastered the song "Las Pistolas" (originally sung with P.N.O), renaming it as "Pistola", in this new version it appears alone and was published on the album "Yo Quiero Dinero: Mixtape". In Reychesta album "Mixtape U.S.A" of 2012, one of the tiraeras has been dedicated to the duo, mainly to Rocca, called "Rocca Inmigrante". In "Yo Quiero Dinero: Mixtape" of the year 2013, another call appears "Disparando Novatos", and in "La Lista Negra" of 2014, appears the strip called "De Qué Tú Hablas". In other songs he has made indirect or crazy bullets such as: "Muchos Tratan (Remix)", "Nos Tienen Miedo", "Nos Tienen Miedo Dos", "Somos La Calle", "Todo Lo Que Sube", "Yo No Tengo Tiempo", "Remember This", "No Quisieron Grabarme Fuck With Me", "I'm Back", "Pistola", "Nunca Los Perdonare (Remix)", "Sigo En La Mia", "Lirica Pura", "En Esta Orilla", "Hold Your Own" and "Mi Regreso". Rocca and P.N.O have also made songs with hints towards Reychesta, such as: "Entremos Al Party", "No Es Real", "Así Es", "La Red". In 2016 and due to conflicts with "Chosen Few Emerald Entertainment, Inc.", Reychesta changed his stage name to Primera corona, referring to the name of the former group. In 2017, in the magazine Rolling Stone: Colombia, they published Rocca biography, entitled: De Bogotá a París (round trip).
Excerpt from the published biography:
Tres Coronas was taking shape and Dominican Reychesta would join the project, according to Rocca: “He was very talented in freestyle, that's why we chose him, but he was very rough, he didn't write his lyrics. Freestyle doesn't make a record, it doesn't make a good song.

 La Música Es Mi Arma, second and last studio album of "Tres Coronas" (2009–2011) 

In mid-2009, Rocca and P.N.O had already finished the new album "La Música Es Mi Arma", unfortunately the label "Machete Music" did not understand the concept of the album. There were changes in directives and the rapper duo had to face their seal in a legal battle to release the album. The label said: "We are not going to get that record; it is not known if it is Reggaeton, Rap or Folklore". They spent a year and a half trying to recover the album with the help of lawyers. That fight ended up depleting Tres Coronas, they also felt that a good part of their audience had remained in the most basic and traditional rap schemes of the '90, and only now many begin to appreciate the work of that moment. Finally, in 2011, they published the album, a special edition exclusively for Colombia was also released.

In 2011, they were interviewed by Ritmo Urbano Magazine.
Excerpt from the interview:
Ritmo Urbano: How did the separation of Reychesta from the group affect Tres Coronas?
Rocca: "It did not affect us at all, on the contrary, when he left king, to walk, we began to fly, we had nominations in Latin Grammy, we were in many important festivals and especially we have been able to develop a more creole, more Latin style. Everything happens for a reason and the separation with Rey was the best thing that could happen to us. You have to know how to remove the stones from your shoes in time, but you get stuck in the middle of the road".
Ritmo Urbano: What other projects do you have on your doorstep?
Tres Coronas (Rocca & P.N.O): "We continue working with Tres Coronas for an upcoming album, we have songs already recorded with Nach from Spain, with the rapper from Brooklyn; Joell Ortiz, with Flaco Flow & Melania , with Eye-N-See, with Gab Gotcha, etc., the next album will have more collaborations. We never stop working, that has also been our strength".

 Return of "Tres Coronas" (2019) 

In September 2019, the return of "Tres Coronas" (Rocca & P.N.O) was announced at the Colombian festival, "Hip Hop al Parque", scheduled for October 5.

 Music producers who worked with the group 

Gallegos is Algeria Arab raised in Paris. Artwell Smart is a Puerto Rican Cuban. Shakim was born in Peru and raised in New York. Chaze was born in Paris. Lorenzo Rocca (Rocca younger brother) initially known as Traffic, then by his real name, was born in Paris. A.n.D (Armen & Lenny Barr) Armen was born in Paris and raised in Brooklyn, and Lenny Barr born in Armenia and raised in Paris. DJ Kodh was born in Madagascar and raised in Paris. P. Castro, now known as DJ Nomad, was born in Colombia and raised in New York. Midas was born in London. Benny Bajo was born in Colombia.

 Trivia 

In 2004 Reychesta and P.N.O traveled to Puerto Rico to make an album produced by DJ Playero, unfortunately, this project was never completed.

Rocca and P.N.O were preparing a new album, after "La Música Es Mi Arma", which was canceled because Rocca and P.N.O decided to pursue solo careers. For that album among the songs that were already recorded there was one with Joell Ortiz (from Brooklyn), which was never named, another with Nach (from Spain) called "Perro No Come Perro" produced by DJ Joaking, from which Nach released a version only in 2016, for the production called "Cazadores De Instantes: La Mixtape".

Valles T, twice winner of Red Bull Batalla De Gallos 2016 and 2018, also champion of "Pura Calle" 2019, said he grew up listening to Tres Coronas.

On February 20, 2019, the Argentinian rapper Dano premieres his album "Istmo", in which he puts a verse from Reychesta, from the song "Rateros" by Tres Coronas, for his song called "Madrugada" with Ergo Pro.

Currently, they incorporate Trap in their tracks, each of the three separately.

 Recognitions and nomination for Latin Grammy 2007 

In 2006, the song "Vamos a Jugar" with Kafu Banton, was on the playlist of MTV Tr3s, mun2 and Univision. In 2007 they were nominated for the 8th Annual Latin Grammy Awards, nominating in the category best urban song, a remix of "Mi Tumbao" with Michael Stuart. He competed against Calle 13, Orishas, Daddy Yankee and Don Omar with Wisin & Yandel. Finally Residente and Visitante won the prize. Reychesta gave his opinion on this nomination, saying: "Why didn't they nominate the song "Mi Tumbao", the original version of Rocca, and nominate the remix? That's because he sings Michael Stuart that's why they were nominated, if I had recorded with him I would also be nominated". "How did you who sold 5000 copies were nominated, and other singers who sold more than 100,000 copies were not nominated?". "The record company "Machete Music" should have discreetly arranged the nomination for the 8th Annual Latin Grammy Awards of Rocca and P.N.O, with the members of the Latin Academy".

 Record labels 

The negotiations for the different distributions of the Tres Coronas albums were, in Colombia for the label "5–27 Records" (of the group La Etnnia), in France, Belgium, Switzerland and Spain, for the "2Good" stamp, in Spain for the "3X2 Distribution" label, in United States for the stamps "Fania Allstar" and "Universal Music Group", the latter also did it for South America, lowered his Latin American department "Machete Music''".

Discography

Tres Coronas (Reychesta, P.N.O and Rocca) 
2001: Mixtape (Parcero Production/5–27 Records)

2002: Mixtape Remix (Parcero Production)

2004: New York Mixtape (Parcero Production/Ecko Unltd.)

2005: Nuestra Cosa (Parcero Production/2Good)

2006: Nuestra Cosa: Deluxe Edition (Parcero Production/Machete Music)

Tres Coronas (P.N.O and Rocca) 
2007: Street Album (Parcero Production)

2008: Mas Fuerte (Parcero Production/Wrung/Boa Música)

2011: La Música Es Mi Arma (Audio Lírica Entertainment/Parcero Production)

2011: La Música Es Mi Arma: Deluxe Edition (Audio Lírica Entertainment/Parcero Production)

Demo unpublished

In solitary

Rocca 
1997: Entre Deux Mondes (Arsenal Records/Barclay (record label)/Delabel Editions/Kouveau Deal Management)
2001: Elevación (Promo) (Barclay (record label)/Wrung/Lickshot Entertainment/Parcero Production/Grim Music)
2001: Elevación (Barclay (record label)/Wrung/Lickshot Entertainment/Parcero Production/Grim Music)
2003: Amor Suprême (Promo) (Barclay (record label)/Universal Music Group/Parcero Production/SCPP (Civil Society of Phonographic Producers)/Orchestra)
2003: Amor Suprême (Barclay (record label)/Universal Music Group/Parcero Production/SCPP (Civil Society of Phonographic Producers)/Orchestra)
2012: Le Calme Sous La Pluie (Musicast)
2013: El Chief: Mixtape (Vol. 1) (Street Trash Records)
2013: El Chief: Mixtape (Vol. 2) (Street Trash Records)
2015: Bogotá París (El Original Production/PIAS Recordings/Believe Digital/All French Distribution)

P.N.O 
1999: QWALIFIED (Correct Course Records)
2016: Mixed Blood: Mix-Tape (Audio Lírica Entertainment)

Reychesta 
1998: Cliffhangaz con Mista Sinista, Shakim & A.B. Universal (Fat Beats Records)
2009: Tequendama (Live) with Radikal People & Callao Cartel (Legalize Records)
2011: El Underground Mixtape (Vol. 1) (Primera Corona Records/La Vega Entertainment)
2012: Mixtape U.S.A (Primera Corona Records/Chosen Few Emerald Entertainment, Inc./La Vega Entertainment)
2013: Yo Quiero Dinero: Mixtape (Primera Corona Records/La Vega Entertainment)
2013: Narco Rap Corridos: Mixtape with Capo C (Primera Corona Records)
2014: La Lista Negra (Primera Corona Records)
2016: Inferno (Trakblazers Entertainment)
2019: Los Gapvillanes: The Mixtape (Primera Corona Records/Baby BoyZz Incorporated)
2019: Equipo Armado: Mixtape with Bajito Exclusivo & Peso El Negro Latino (Baby BoyZz Incorporated)

Other Distributions Made by Parcero Production

Macko 
2004: Páginas De La Vida... (Makial Clan/Fun Shop)
2005: Mentes Libres (Vol. 2)
2007: De Vuelta a La Esencia: Mixtape (Makial Clan/Fun Shop)
2009: Substancia Explícita: Mixtape

External links 

 TRES CORONAS PARA EL HIP HOP
 VUELVE HIP HOP DE TRES CORONAS
 Revista Rapero 1 by D-dayz Benitez - Issuu
 https://www.ritmourbano.com.mx/2012/02/entrevista-a-tres-coronas/ 
 Rocca: el joven criado en Colombia que se soñó rapeando en francés
 Rocca: un verdadero caminando entres dos mundos
 TRES CORONAS: La música es su arma
 https://www.bacanika.com/historia/perfiles/item/rocca.html 
 Inicio
 Inicio
 "Traemos lo que en este momento necesita América Latina": Tres Coronas
 Tres Coronas
 BrownPride.com : Articles

Musical groups established in 2001
Musical groups from Queens, New York